KPLE-CD, virtual channel 30 (UHF digital channel 31), is a low-powered, Class A TCT-affiliated television station licensed to Killeen, Texas, United States. The station is owned by the Killeen Christian Broadcasting Corporation.

The station's transmitter is located on Old Florence Road in downtown Killeen.

Digital channels
The station's digital signal is multiplexed:

References

External links
KPLE-CD Website

Low-power television stations in the United States
KPLE-CD
Television channels and stations established in 2006
Tri-State Christian Television affiliates
2006 establishments in Texas